Otto II (after 1147 – July 4, 1205), called The Generous, was the third Margrave of Brandenburg from 1184 until his death.

Life
Otto II was born into the House of Ascania as the eldest son of Otto I and Judith, a daughter of the Piast Duke of Poland Bolesław III Wrymouth. Some time after his father died, Otto II married his father's widow, Ada of Holland. But he was childless.

Margrave of Brandenburg
After succeeding his father, he improved the defense and settlement of Brandenburg and waged campaigns against the Slavs and Canute VI of Denmark. In the winter of 1198–99 he devastated Danish-occupied Pomerania and consolidated his territorial gains in the subsequent year with a campaign that pressed to Rügen and threatened Hamburg. In 1200 and 1203, he supported the Hohenstaufen king Philip of Swabia against the Welfen Holy Roman Emperor, Otto IV.

Succession
After his death, his half-brother Albert II inherited the margraviate.

References

Sources
 
 
 

Otto 02
Brandenburg, Otto II of
Brandenburg, Otto II of
Otto 02